The Battle of Grünberg (21 March 1761) was fought between French and allied Prussian and Hanoverian troops in the Seven Years' War at village of Grünberg, Hesse, near Stangenrod.  The French, led by the Jacques Philippe de Choiseul, inflicted a significant defeat on the allies, taking several thousand prisoners, and capturing 18 military standards.  The allied loss prompted Duke Ferdinand of Brunswick to lift the siege of Cassel and retreat.

References

The History of the Seven Years' War in Germany
War, State, And Society in mid-eighteenth-century Britain and Ireland

Battles involving France
Battles of the Seven Years' War
Battles involving Hesse-Kassel
Conflicts in 1761
1761 in the Holy Roman Empire
Battles in Hesse

External links
1761-03-21 - Engagement of Grünberg at kronoskaf.com